Alta Jerarquía is the sixth studio album by Puerto Rican singer-songwriter Tito El Bambino, released on November 24, 2014 by On Fire Music. This album contains more urban songs and collaborations due to requests from the artist by the fans through social networks, who wanted the singer returned to the genre with which he became known. The album included the singles "A Que No Te Atreves" (featuring Chencho) of the duo Plan B, "Controlando" and "Adicto a Tus Redes" (featuring Nicky Jam).

It debuted at number 3 on US Billboard Top Latin Albums selling over 3,000 copies on the first week.

Track listing

Reissue

On May 26, 2015 Alta Jerarquía: Instrumental, a reissue with all instrumentals used in the album, was released only on digital format.

References

2014 albums
Tito El Bambino albums